Telephone numbers in China are organized according to the Chinese Telephone Code Plan. The numerical formats of landlines and mobile phones are different: landlines have area codes, whereas mobile phones do not. In major cities, landline numbers consist of a two-digit area code followed by an eight-digit inner number. In other places, landline numbers consist of a three-digit area code followed by a seven- or eight-digit internal number. The numbers of mobile phones consist of eleven digits.

When one landline is used to dial another landline within the same area, it is not necessary to specify the area code. The target number must be prepended between different regions with the trunk prefix, which is 0.

Calling a mobile phone from a landline requires the addition of the "0" in front of the mobile phone number if they are not in the same area. Mobile to landline calls requires the "0" and the area code if the landline is not within the same place. Mobile to mobile calls does not require the "0" outside mainland China.

The Special Administrative Regions of Hong Kong and Macau and the region of Taiwan are not part of this numbering plan and use the country codes +852, +853 and +886, respectively.

Mobile phones 
In mainland China, mobile phone numbers have 11 digits in the format 1xx-XXXX-XXXX (except for 140–144, which are 13-digit IoT numbers), in which the first three digits (13x to 19x) designate the mobile phone service provider.

Before GSM, mobile phones had 6-digit (later upgraded to 7-digit) numbers starting with nine. They had the same numbering format as fixed-line telephones. Those numbers were eventually translated into 1390xx9xxx, where xx were local identifiers.

The oldest China Mobile GSM numbers were ten digits long and started with 139 in 1994, the second oldest 138 in 1997, and 137, 136, 135 in 1999. The oldest China Unicom numbers started with 130 in 1995, the second oldest at 131 in 1998. Keeping the same number over time is somewhat associated with the stability and reliability of the owner. The 5th to the seventh digit sometimes relates to age and location.

China's mobile phone numbers upgraded from 10-digit to 11-digit, with 0 added after 13x, and thus HLR code became 4-digit long to expand the capacity of the seriously fully crowded numbering plan.

In 2006, 15x numbers were introduced.In late 2008, 18x and 14x (for data plans or IoT) were introduced. In late 2013, 17x were introduced. In 2017, 16x and 19x were introduced.

In December 2016, each cell phone number was required to be consigned to a real name in mainland China.

In November 2010, MIIT has started the trial mobile number portability service in Tianjin and Hainan, in 2012 the trial has extended to Jiangxi, Hubei and Yunan provinces. In 10 November 2019, all provinces started accepting MNP requests for all mobile carriers, except for technical difficults, the MVNO phones, satellite phones and IoT phones.

As of 2016, all carriers are releasing USIM cards.

Mobile service carriers can be identified by the first three or four digits as follows:

1 – China Unicom before 2009

2 – Operated by China Transport Telecommunication Information Group Co., Ltd.

3 – TD-SCDMA networks are deprecated by China Mobile in 2020

4 – GSM networks are being deprecated by China Unicom since c.2020, scheduled to shut down in 2023~2024

5 – cdmaOne networks are being deprecated by China Telecom since c.2020, scheduled to shut down in 2023~2024, CDMA2000 networks are deprecated in 2022

6 – LTE compatiblity of China Broadnet SIM cards only available on Apple iOS devices

1G TACS networks were provided by China Telecom since 1987, then operations splitted to be under China Mobile in 1999, the year CM has established, 1G has shutted down in 2001.

Calling formats 
To call phone numbers in China one of the following formats is used:

 For fixed phones:
xxx xxxx | xxxx xxxx Calls within the same area code

0yyy xxx xxxx | 0yyy xxxx xxxx Calls from other areas within China

+86 yyy xxx xxxx | +86 yyy xxxx xxxx Calls from outside China

 For mobile phones:
1nn xxxx xxxx Calls to mobile phones within China

+86 1nn xxxx xxxx Calls to mobiles from outside China

Area 1 – Capital Operation Center 
The prefix one is used exclusively by the national capital, Beijing Municipality.

 Beijing – 10 (formerly 1, abolished after GSM was introduced, to avoid conflict with mobile phone numbers with prefix 0 added (e.g. 0139-xxxx-xxxx))

Area 2 – Country Communication System Operating Center 
These are area codes for the municipalities of Shanghai, Tianjin, and Chongqing, as well as several major cities with early access to telephones. These cities have upgraded to an 8-number system in the past decade. 
All telephone numbers are 8-digit in these areas.

 Guangzhou – 20
Shanghai – 21
Tianjin – 22
Chongqing – 23 1
Shenyang, Tieling, Fushun, Benxi – 24 2
Nanjing – 25
Wuhan, Huarong District of Ezhou – 27
Chengdu, Meishan, Ziyang – 28 3
Xi'an, Xianyang – 29 4

1 - Formerly 811, 814, 819, 810, abolished 1997. 
2 - Formerly 410, 413, abolished 2011, and 414, abolished in 2014.
3 - Formerly 832, 833, abolished 2010. 
4 - Formerly 910, abolished 2006.

It's still unclear whether 26 will be provided or not, some local materials say that it's reserved for Taiwan (especially its capital Taipei), but currently they use +886. Some proposals from planned independent cities to get rights to operate 026 were also unsuccessful.

Area 3 – Northern China Operation Center 
These are area codes for the provinces of Hebei, Shanxi and Henan.

Hebei – 31x 33x 

</div>

Shanxi – 34x 35x 

</div>

Henan – 37x 39x 

</div>

1 - Formerly 378, abolished. 
2 - Formerly 397 for 7 east counties, abolished.

Area 4 – Northeastern China Operation Center 
These are area codes for the autonomous region of Inner Mongolia, and the provinces in Northeast China (Liaoning, Jilin, and Heilongjiang). Additionally, numbers starting 400 are shared-pay (callers are charged local rate anywhere in the country) numbers .

Liaoning – 41x 42x

Jilin – 43x 44x 

</div>

1 - except Gongzhuling which still uses 434 of Siping
2 - Hunchun formerly 440, abolished  
3 - Meihekou, Liuhe, Huinan formerly 448, abolished

Heilongjiang – 45x 46x 

1 -Acheng formerly 450, abolished. 
2 - Jiagedaqi and Songling are de facto under the administration of the Daxing'anlingPrefecture, uses 457.

Inner Mongolia – 47x 48x 

1 - Jiagedaqi and Songling are de facto under the administration of the Daxing'anlingPrefecture, uses 457.

Area 5 – Eastern China Operating Center 
These are area codes for the provinces of Jiangsu, Shandong (predominantly), Anhui, Zhejiang and Fujian.

Jiangsu – 51x 52x 
All telephone numbers are 8-digit in Jiangsu.

1 - Changshu, Kunshan, Taicang, Wujiang and Zhangjiagang are formerly 520, abolished.

Shandong – 53x 54x

Anhui – 55x 56x 

1 - Formerly 565 for Chaohu prefectural city era (i.e. before 2011), later splitted as: Hefei's 551 for Juchao district (now county-level Chaohu) and Lujiang county, Wuhu's 553 for Wuwei and Shenxiang Town of He county (now part of Jiujiang district), and Ma'anshan's 555 for He county (except Shenxiang) and Hanshan county. 
2 - Split from Fuyang in 2000, no new area code allocated.

Zhejiang – 57x 58x

Fujian – 59x 50x 

1 - Kinmen, Matsu, and Wuchiu are under Taiwanese control, and hence use international calling code of +886.

Area 6 – Supplement for Shandong(63x), Guangdong(66x), Yunnan(69x) 
All area codes with prefix 6 were assigned in recent years. This prefix (+866) previously was reserved for Taiwan, which is now assigned (+886).

Shandong – 63x 
While most areas in Shandong use the prefix 53x 54x, some sites also use the prefix 6.

Weihai – 631
Zaozhuang – 632
Rizhao – 633
Liaocheng – 635

Laiwu was using 634, now merged to Jinan's 531, former numbers are re-prefixxed as 5317 when merging.

Guangdong – 66x 
While most areas in Guangdong use the prefix 75x and 76x, some sites also use the prefix 6. The provincial capital Guangzhou uses code 20.

Shanwei – 660
Yangjiang – 662
Jieyang – 663
Maoming – 668

Chaoyang county-level city was using 661, now changed to 754 after splitted to Chaoyang and Chaonan districts and join Shantou.

Yunnan – 69x 
While most areas in Yunnan use the prefix 87x and 88x, a couple of areas also use the prefix 6.

Xishuangbanna – 691
Dehong – 692

Area 7 – Central-Southern China Operating Center 
These are area codes for the central provinces of Hubei, Hunan, Guangdong (predominantly), Jiangxi, and the autonomous region of Guangxi.

Hubei – 71x 72x 

20 - except Huarong district which uses Wuhan's 27.

Hunan – 73x 74x 

21 - Formerly 733, abolished.  
22 - Formerly 732, abolished.

Guangdong – 75x 76x 

 

23 - Shunde formerly 765, abolished.

Guangxi – 77x 78x 
 

24 - Split from Wuzhou Prefecture, original area code inherited. 
25 - Split from Liuzhou Prefecture, original area code inherited. 
26 - Split from Yulin Prefecture, original area code inherited. 
27 - Split from Nanning Prefecture, original area code inherited.

Jiangxi – 79x 70x

Area 8 -Southwestern China Operating Center 
These are area codes for the provinces of Sichuan, Hainan, Guizhou, Yunnan (predominantly) and the autonomous region of Tibet.

Sichuan – 81x 82x 83x

Guizhou – 85x 86x 

 

28 - Formerly 852, 853, abolished 2014.

Yunnan – 87x 88x 
 

29 - Dongchuan formerly 881, incorporated into 871 
30 - also de-facto used by Wa State of

Tibet/Xizang – 89(1–7)

Hainan – 898 
All telephone numbers are 8-digit in Hainan.

Formerly (most likely before 2000), Sanya, Wuzhishan, Lingshui, Ledong, Baoting and Qiongzhong were 899, Danzhou, Dongfang, Lingao, Baisha and Changjiang were 890.

Area 9 – Northwestern China Operating Center 
These are area codes for northwestern regions including the provinces of Shaanxi, Gansu and Qinghai, as well as the autonomous regions of Ningxia and Xinjiang.

Shaanxi (陕西) – 91x 92x

Gansu – 93x 94x 
 

31 - Shared area code due to small size.

Ningxia – 95x 96x

Qinghai – 97x 98x 
 

32 - Area under the administration of Golmud uses 979, other landlines within the prefecture use 977.

Xinjiang – 99x 90x 
 

33 - except Wusu and Dushanzi District which use Kuytun's 992.
34 - except Shawan county which uses Shihezi's 993, and Hoboksar county which uses Karamay's 990.

Emergency numbers 
From within Mainland China, the following emergency numbers are used:

110 – Police (12110 for SMS to police, not for calling, 95110 for maritime policies, 96110 to report frauds)
119 – Fire brigade (12119 for forest fire in some regions)
120 – Ambulance
122 – Traffic accident (incorporated into 110 in some cities) (12122 on expressways)
999 – Privately operated ambulance (Beijing ONLY, calls outside Beijing is 010-999)

In most cities, the emergency numbers assist in Mandarin Chinese and English.

Starting from 2012 in Shenzhen, an implemented system upgrade to unify three emergency reporting services into one number, 110. A similar approach is being installed in more cities in China to make them more convenient.

Dialing 112, 911, and 999 (outside Beijing without area code 010) plays a recording message about the correct emergency numbers in Chinese and English twice: "For police, dial 110. To report a fire, dial 119. For ambulance, dial 120. To report a traffic accident, dial 122." on China Mobile and China Unicom phones, NO SERVICES will be redirected. The error messages "Number does not exist" will be played on China Telecom phones, and NO SERVICES will be redirected. However, some local report said that in sometimes, only within Beijing, China Unicom landlines and mobile phones call 010-112 may be successful as reporting service for call failures.

Others 
From within Mainland China, the following special numbers are used:
100xx – Telecommunications Customer Service
10000 for China Telecom, formerly 1000
10010 for China Unicom, 10015 for auditing CU's services, formerly 1001
10020-10049 for VNOs
10086 for China Mobile (formerly 1860), 10050 for Tietong, 10080 for auditing CM's services, 1008611 for directly checking phone bills
10096 for China Tower
10099 for China Broadnet
106 – SMS access code
11185 – Post (11183 for their EMS)
114 – Directory assistance, operate by China Unicom for the northern 10 provinces, and China Telecom for the southern 21 provinces, China Unicom also operates 116114, and China Telecom 118114 that the operations are same as 114
116xxx – Premium service of China Unicom (e.g. 116114)
118xxx – Premium service of China Telecom (e.g. 118114)
12114 – SMS name and address standard trial platform, not for calling
12117 – Speaking clock
12121 – Weather
12123 – Traffic police services
123xx – Government service, 12345 is the general number for all services below, that may be transited by 12345 operators upon kind of requests:

12303 – proposals
12305 – SPB post appeals
12306 – railway services
(10-)12308 – MFA Consular assistance
12309 – SPP reports
12310 – CIOC reports
12313 – tobacco reports
12314 – water reports
12315 – consumer reports
12316 – agricultural services
(10-)12317 – poverty helps
12318 – cultural reports
12319 – urban development services
12320 – health services
12321 – MIIT Internet disinfos and spam reports
12323 – MNR maritime report
12325 – food audit
12326 – CAAC audit
12328 – transportation illegal reports
12329 – housing fund services
12333 – MHRSS services
(10-)12335 – MoC Multinational corporation reports
12337 – CPLAC anti-blacks
12338 – women helps
12339 – MSS reports
12340 – statistics
12348 – MoJ legal services and aids
12350 – MEM safety reports
12351 – ACFTU workers' helps
12355 – CYL Adolescence services
12360 – custom services
12361 – PDCCP Xuexi Qiangguo
12363 – PBC financial reports
12366 – tax services
12367 – immigration services
12368 – court services
12369 – environment reports
(10-)12370 – MHRSS Civil services
12371 – ODCCP community member consult
12377 – CAC Internet illegal and disinfo reports
12378 – CBIRC reports
(10-)12379 – MEM emergency situation info release
12380 – ODCCP reports
12381 – MIIT public services
12385 – disabled services
12386 – CSRC Investor services
12388 – CCDI and NSC reports
12389 – MPS reports
12390 – anti-pornography, illegal and copyvio publishing reports
12393 – NHSA services
12395 – MSA Shipwrecking helps
12398 – energy audits

124x – Carrier Identification Code (formerly 190/196/197, abolished in 2018, to create space for mobile phone numbers.)
125xx – Premium service of China Mobile (e.g. 12580 for China Mobile's Directory assistance)
179xx + target number followed – VoIP (e.g. 17901-133-0000-0000, 1790 for China Telecom, 1791 for China Unicom, and 1795 for China Mobile)
400 xxx xxxx, 800 xxx xxxx – business numbers
Differences: bills for 400 numbers are paid by both originating and terminating callers, and support calling from both landlines and mobile phones (usually 400-1/7 operate by China Mobile, 400-0/6 operate by China Unicom, 400-8/9 operate by China Telecom); bills for 800 numbers are just paid by terminating callers, but for non-landline users, mostly only China Telecom mobile phones may call 800 phones, because nearly all 800 phones are operated by China Telecom
400-881-0000 for auditing China Telecom's services
95xxx, 95xxxx, 95105xxx- Service number (nationally)
955xx – Bank, Insurance, Airlines service hotline, (nationally, ex. 95588 – Industrial and Commercial Bank of China (ICBC) )
96xxx, 96xxxx – Service number (locally, area code needed for calls from other provinces or autonomous region or province-level municipality.)
(ex. 962288 in Shanghai – Shanghai foreigner assistant hotline, outside Shanghai  people should dial 021-962288, or they will receive an error message or undesired service message)

Former 
20x (mainly 200 and 201) – was used for IC telephone service, to be reserved for mobile phones

International Access Code 
The international access code from the PRC is 00. This must also be used for calls to Taiwan, Hong Kong and Macau from the Chinese mainland, together with their separate international codes, as follows:

See also 
 Telecommunications in China
 Telephone numbers in Hong Kong
 Telephone numbers in Macau
 Toll-free telephone number, China

References

External links 
 

 
China
China communications-related lists